D500 is a state road connecting A8 motorway (Vranja interchange) to Kršan and D64 state road.

The road, as well as all other state roads in Croatia, is managed and maintained by Hrvatske ceste, a state owned company.

Traffic volume 

Traffic is regularly counted and reported by Hrvatske ceste, operator of the road. Substantial variations between annual (AADT) and summer (ASDT) traffic volumes are attributed to the fact that the road connects A8 motorway carrying substantial tourist traffic.

Road junctions and populated areas

Sources

See also
 BINA Istra

State roads in Croatia
Transport in Istria County